The discography of Barbadian R&B and pop singer Shontelle contains two studio albums, five singles and ten music videos.

Shontelle's debut album, Shontelligence, was released on November 18, 2008. The album reached number 115 on the Billboard 200, selling 6,200 records in its first week, and reached number twenty-four on the R&B/Hip-Hop Albums chart. It was re-released on March 10, 2009, and has since sold 30,000 records in the US. "T-Shirt", was the first and debut single released by Shontelle, it was released in July 2008 and reached number thirty-six on the Billboard Hot 100, becoming a moderate hit. However, it reached the top ten in the United Kingdom, peaking at number six there. The second single from the album, "Stuck with Each Other", featuring Akon, was released in February 2009 in the US and May 2009 in the UK. The single failed to chart in the US, but reached number twenty-three in the United Kingdom.

Shontelle's second album, No Gravity, was released in the US on September 21, 2010. In the first week of release, No Gravity placed at number 81 on the Billboard 200, selling 7,000 copies. The lead single from the album, "Impossible", was released in February 2010 for digital download, but failed to garner success until May 2010, when it debuted on the Billboard Hot 100. It has since become her most successful single to date, reaching number thirteen on the Billboard Hot 100. The second single from the album, "Perfect Nightmare", was released in August 2010. "Say Hello to Goodbye" was released to pop radio on March 15 as the third single. On March 14, 2020, Shontelle released "Remember Me" for digital download.

Albums

Studio albums

Singles

As lead artist

Promotional singles

As featured artist

Music videos

References

External links
Official Shontelle Website
Official Shontelle Fansite

Rhythm and blues discographies
Discographies of Barbadian artists